Germany held a national final to select the song that would represent Germany at the Eurovision Song Contest 1957. The winner was Margot Hielscher with the song "".

Before Eurovision

National final 
The German national final was held on 17 February at the Großer Sendesaal des HR in Frankfurt, hosted by Hans-Joachim Kulenkampff.

At Eurovision 
Germany was the host country of the Eurovision Song Contest 1957, held in Frankfurt, when there was still no format in place for the previous year's winning country to host the following year, and following Switzerland hosting and winning in 1956. The song received eight points, placing fourth in a field of ten. The song's lyrics gave rise to what is generally considered the first "gimmick performance" in the contest history, with Hielscher in fact picking up a real telephone receiver during her performance. At the end of the song, she picks it up again and explains "on the telephone" that she can't talk anymore because her song is ending. It was succeeded as German representative at the 1958 contest by Hielscher again, with "".

Voting 
Every country had a jury of ten people. Every jury member could give one point to his or her favourite song.

References

External links 
 Official Eurovision Song Contest 1957 site, history by year
 Detailed info & lyrics, Diggiloo Thrush

1957
Countries in the Eurovision Song Contest 1957
Eurovision